Mel Tormé Sings Fred Astaire is a 1956 album by Mel Tormé, recorded in tribute to Fred Astaire. This was Tormé's second recording with Marty Paich and his Dek-Tette.

Track listing 
 "Nice Work If You Can Get It" (George Gershwin, Ira Gershwin) – 3:12
 "Something's Gotta Give" (Johnny Mercer) – 4:00
 "A Foggy Day" (G. Gershwin, I. Gershwin) – 2:47
 "A Fine Romance" (Dorothy Fields, Jerome Kern) – 3:04
 "Let's Call the Whole Thing Off" (G. Gershwin, I. Gershwin) – 3:29
 "Top Hat, White Tie and Tails" (Berlin) – 3:11
 "The Way You Look Tonight" (Fields, Kern) – 2:25
 "The Piccolino" (Berlin) – 2:38
 "They Can't Take That Away from Me" (G. Gershwin, I. Gershwin) – 3:04
 "Cheek to Cheek" (Berlin) – 3:01
 "Let's Face the Music and Dance" (Berlin) – 2:22
 "They All Laughed" (G. Gershwin, I. Gershwin) – 2:30

Personnel 
 Mel Tormé - vocals
 Marty Paich - arranger, conductor
 Herb Geller - alto
 Jack Montrose - tenor
 Jack DuLong - baritone
 Pete Candoli - trumpet
 Don Fagerquist - trumpet
 Bob Enevoldsen - valve trombone and tenor
 Vince DeRosa - French horn
 Albert Pollan - tuba
 Max Bennett - bass
 Alvin Stoller - drums

References 

1956 albums
Mel Tormé albums
Albums arranged by Marty Paich
Fred Astaire tribute albums
Bethlehem Records albums
Albums conducted by Marty Paich